Snuff is a type of smokeless tobacco product made from finely ground or pulverized tobacco leaves.
It is snorted or "sniffed" (alternatively sometimes written as "snuffed") into the nasal cavity, delivering a swift hit of nicotine and a lasting flavored scent (especially if flavoring has been blended with the tobacco). Traditionally, it is sniffed or inhaled lightly after a pinch of snuff is either placed onto the back surface of the hand, held pinched between thumb and index finger, or held by a specially made "snuffing" device.

Snuff originated in the Americas and was in common use in Europe by the 17th century. Traditional snuff production consists of a lengthy, multi-step process, in tobacco snuff mills. The selected tobacco leaves are first subject to special tobacco curing or fermentation processes, where they will later provide the individual characteristics and flavor for each type of snuff blend.  Snuff is usually scented or flavored, with many blends of snuff requiring months to years of special storage to reach the required maturity.  Typical traditional flavors are varieties of blended tobacco leaves considered original "fine snuff" without any addition of scents or essences.  Varieties of spice, piquant, fruit, floral, and mentholated (also called "medicated") soon followed, either pure or in blends.  Each snuff manufacturer usually has a variety of unique recipes and blends, as well as special recipes for individual customers. Common flavors also include coffee, chocolate, bordeaux, honey, vanilla, cherry, orange, apricot, plum, camphor, cinnamon, rose and spearmint.  Modern flavors include bourbon, cola and whisky. Traditional classic German snuff blends are the pungent and sharp Schmalzler and Brasil blends.

Snuff comes in a range of texture and moistness, from very fine to coarse, and from toast (very dry) to very moist. Often drier snuffs are ground more finely. There is also a range of tobacco-free snuffs, such as Pöschl's Weiss (White), made from glucose powder or herbs. While strictly speaking, these are not snuffs because they contain no tobacco, they are an alternative for those who wish to avoid nicotine, or for "cutting" a strong snuff to an acceptable strength.

History

The indigenous populations of Brazil were the first people known to have used ground tobacco as snuff. They would grind their tobacco leaves using a mortar and pestle made of rosewood, where the tobacco would also acquire a delicate aroma of the wood. The resulting snuff was then stored airtight in ornate bone bottles or tubes to preserve its flavor for later consumption.

Snuff-taking by the Taino and Carib people of the Lesser Antilles was observed by the Franciscan friar Ramón Pané on Columbus' second voyage to the New World in 1493. Pané returned to Spain with snuff, introducing it to Europe.

In the early 16th century, the Spanish Casa de Contratación (House of Trade) established and held a trade monopoly in the first manufacturing industries of snuff, in the city of Seville, which became Europe's first manufacturing and development centre for snuff. The Spanish called snuff polvo or rapé. At first they were independent production mills dispersed within the city, state control over the activity later concentrated the production to one location opposite the Church of San Pedro. By the mid-18th century it was decided to build a large and grand industrial building outside the city walls, and thus the Royal Tobacco Factory (Real Fábrica de Tabacos) was built, becoming Europe's first industrial tobacco factory, producing snuff and auctioning tobacco at first, and Spain's second largest building at the time.

In 1561 Jean Nicot, the French ambassador in Lisbon, Portugal, who described tobacco's medicinal properties as a panacea in his writings, is credited with introducing ground tobacco snuff to the Royal Court of Catherine de' Medici to treat her persistent headaches. Catherine was so impressed with its curative relieving properties, she promptly declared the tobacco would henceforth be termed Herba Regina (Queen Herb). Her royal seal of approval would help popularize snuff among the French nobility.

The Dutch, who named the ground powdered tobacco "snuff" (snuif), were using the product by 1560. By the early 1600s, snuff had become an expensive luxury commodity. In 1611, commercially manufactured snuff made its way to North America by way of John Rolfe, the husband of Pocahontas, who introduced a sweeter Spanish variety of tobacco to North America. Though most of the colonists in America never fully accepted the English style of snuff use, American aristocrats used snuff. Snuff use in England increased in popularity after the Great Plague of London (1665–1666) as people believed snuff had valuable medicinal properties, which added a powerful impetus to its consumption. By 1650, snuff use had spread from France to England, Scotland, and Ireland, and throughout Europe, as well as Japan, China, and Africa.

By the 17th century some prominent objectors to snuff-taking arose. Pope Urban VIII banned the use of snuff in churches and threatened to excommunicate snuff-takers. In Russia in 1643, Tsar Michael prohibited the sale of tobacco, instituted the punishment of removing the nose of those who used snuff, and declared that persistent users of tobacco would be killed. Despite this, use persisted elsewhere; King Louis XIII of France was a devout snuff-taker, whereas later, Louis XV of France banned the use of snuff from the Royal Court of France during his reign.

By the 18th century, snuff had become the tobacco product of choice among the elite. Snuff use reached a peak in England during the reign of Queen Anne (1702–14). It was during this time that England's own production of ready-made snuff blends started; home-made blending was common. Prominent snuff users included Pope Benedict XIII who repealed the smoking ban set by Pope Urban VIII; Queen Anne; King George III's wife Queen Charlotte, referred to as 'Snuffy Charlotte', who had an entire room at Windsor Castle devoted to her snuff stock; and King George IV, who had his own special blends and hoarded a stockpile of snuff. Napoleon, Lord Nelson, the Duke of Wellington, Marie Antoinette, Alexander Pope, Samuel Johnson and Benjamin Disraeli all used snuff, as well as numerous other notable persons. The taking of snuff helped to distinguish the elite members of society from the common people, who generally smoked their tobacco.

It was also during the 18th century that an English author and botanist, John Hill, concluded nasal cancer could develop with the use of snuff. Under the guise of a doctor, he reported five cases of "polyps, a swelling in the nostril adherent with the symptoms of open cancer". In Victorian era Britain, a few miracle "snake oil" claims on the health or curative benefits of certain snuff types surfaced in publications. For instance, a London weekly journal called The Gentlewoman advised readers with ailing sight to use the correct type of Portuguese snuff, "whereby many eminent people had cured themselves so that they could read without spectacles after having used them for many years".

Snuff's image as an aristocratic luxury attracted the first U.S. federal tax on tobacco, created in 1794. Despite two centuries of pipe smoking and snuff use, by the mid-1850s, North Americans rejected European practices in general—especially British practices—that entailed snuff boxes and formality. By the late 1700s, taking snuff nasally had fallen out of fashion in the United States. Instead, dry snuff users would use a twig as a brush to "dip" the snuff, which then involved placing the snuff inside the cheek. This is seen as a precursor to dipping tobacco (moist snuff) use which is still very much popular today. In addition, orally chewing tobacco or dipping snuff was more convenient for Americans trekking westward in their wagons. During the 1800s until the mid-1930s, a communal snuff box was installed for members of the US Congress. American snuff is subject to the same warning labels on all smokeless tobacco, indicating a possibility of oral cancer and tooth loss. This reflects the fact that American dry snuff users may still use the product orally, unlike the majority of Europe, but nasal use of snuff is also practiced by some users. Dry snuff is typically not readily available outside of the South and Appalachia, unlike its successor, dipping tobacco (moist snuff), which is available throughout the United States and is much more widely consumed.

In certain areas of Africa, some claim that snuff reached native Africans before white Europeans did, even though tobacco is not indigenous to Africa. A fictional representation of this is in Chinua Achebe's novel Things Fall Apart, where the Igbo villagers are regular snuff-takers long before they ever encountered the first British missionaries. In some African countries, such as South Africa and Nigeria, snuff is still popular with the older generation, though its use is slowly declining, with cigarette smoking becoming the dominant form of tobacco use. This includes parts of southern Ethiopia, where powdered tobaccos can be purchased at many larger markets across the Oromo region.

Around the time of the 2007 smoking ban in England, snuff has regained some degree of popularity.

Accessories

When snuff-taking was fashionable, the manufacture of snuff accessories was a lucrative industry in several cultures. In Europe, snuff boxes ranged from those made in very basic materials, such as horn, to highly ornate designs featuring precious materials made using state-of-the-art techniques. Since prolonged exposure to air causes snuff to dry out and lose its quality, pocket snuff boxes were designed to be airtight containers with strong hinges, generally with enough space for a day's worth of snuff only.
Large snuff containers, called mulls (made from a variety of materials, notably including rams horns decorated with silver), were usually kept on the table.

An accessory often carried with the snuff box was the snuff spoon, a small spoon used for snuff-taking, that was used to avoid staining the fingers with powder.

A floral-scented snuff called "English Rose" is provided for members of the British House of Commons. Recent practice has been for this tradition to be maintained at the principal doorkeeper's personal expense due to smoking in the House being banned since 1693. A famous silver communal snuff box kept at the entrance of the House was destroyed in an air raid during World War II with a replacement being subsequently presented to the House by Winston Churchill. Very few members are said to take snuff nowadays.

In China, snuff bottles were used, usually available in two forms, both made of glass. In one type, glass bottles were decorated on the inside to protect the design. Another type used layered multi-colored glass; parts of the layers were removed to create a picture. Another common accessory is the snuff bullet, which is designed to make snuff use easier and more discreet in public situations. These are small, bullet shaped devices that you would use to store a small amount of snuff for use throughout the day.

The self-applicator pipe is known as ‘Kuripe’, and the blow pipe is known as a ‘Tepi’ in the Brazilian tradition.

Sneezing
When sniffed, snuff often causes a sneeze, though this is often seen by snuff-takers as the sign of a beginner. This is not uncommon; however, the tendency to sneeze varies with the person and the particular snuff. Generally, drier snuffs are more likely to do this. For this reason, sellers of snuff often sell handkerchiefs. Slapstick comedy and cartoons have often made use of snuff's sneeze-inducing properties.

Health
A study program initiated in 1969 by the World Health Organization (WHO) International Agency for Research on Cancer (IARC), titled "IARC Monographs on the Evaluation of Carcinogenic Risks to Humans, Volume 89, Smokeless Tobacco and Some Tobacco-specific N-Nitrosamines", published in 2007 representing the views and expert opinions of the IARC Working Group; concluded on snuff-taking and snuff tobacco that "studies on nasal use of snuff did not provide conclusive evidence of a relationship with cancer [...] There is sufficient evidence in experimental animals for the carcinogenicity of moist snuff." The study program was also supported by the United States National Cancer Institute, the European Commission Directorate-General (Employment and Social Affairs) Health, Safety and Hygiene at Work Unit, and the United States National Institute of Environmental Health Sciences.

Sapundzhiev & Werner (2003) found that the chronic "abuse [of nasal sniffing of dry snuff] leads to morphological and functional changes in the nasal mucosa", but, although dry nasal snuff "contains many substances that are potentially carcinogenic, there is no epidemiological evidence for increased incidence of local malignancies in habitual snuff users."

A recent systematic review of studies published in this area concluded that there is "strong evidence that smokeless tobacco produces dependency".

Versus cigarettes
Users of smokeless tobacco products, including snuff, face no known cancer risk to the lungs, but, depending on the form of the smokeless tobacco product being consumed, may have other increased cancer risks than people who do not consume any form of tobacco products. To date there have been no health suits filed against any of the UK's snuff manufacturers and, based on current knowledge, there is no evidence to suggest that nasal snuff causes lung cancer when used, as intended, nasally. As the primary harm from smoking to lungs comes from the smoke itself, snuff has been proposed as a way of reducing harm from tobacco.

An article from the 1981 British Medical Journal examining "Nicotine intake by snuff users" concluded:

Sale of snuff, tax and legal issues

Snuff is readily available over the counter in most European tobacco shops, it is also subject to the same sale and purchase age restrictions as with other tobacco products in accordance with local laws. In the United Kingdom, tobacco duty is not charged on "nasal" snuff tobacco.

In the Republic of Ireland it is illegal to take snuff in workplaces and bars.

In the United States, snuff is less readily available and is typically found only in specialty tobacco shops or online. 

Smokeless tobacco products including snuff are banned from sale in Australia but up to 1.5kg may be imported for personal use only.

See also
 Anatomical snuffbox
 Jack and His Golden Snuff-Box, a fairy tale
 Snuff box
 Artisans
 Adolf Frederick, King of Sweden
 The Blarenberghe brothers
 Rosalba Carriera
 Daniel Macnee
 Juste-Aurèle Meissonnier
 George Michael Moser, 18th-century snuff-box maker
 Airtight "Laurencekirk hinge"
 Creamy snuff
 Herbal smokeless tobacco (tobacco-free snuff, chewing, etc.)
 Snus

References

Further reading
 Bourne, Ursula Snuff. Shire Publications, 1990. 
 Hazen, Edward, The Panorama of Professions and Trades. 1836.
 Hinds, John D., The Use of Tobacco. 1882. Medicolegal.tripod.com

Tobacco products
Smoking
Dosage forms